Eye Green Local Nature Reserve is a 12 hectare Local Nature Reserve in Eye Green in Cambridgeshire. It was managed by the Wildlife Trust for Bedfordshire, Cambridgeshire and Northamptonshire until September 2016, when management was transferred to its owner, Peterborough City Council. A small (and inaccessible) part is also in the Eye Gravel Pit geological Site of Special Scientific Interest.

This site was formerly brick workings, and a large area is now filled by a lake. Reeds and scrub line much of the shore, providing cover for water birds such coots and moorhens, while dunnocks and great tits nest in dense scrub. There is grassland with many flowers, and diverse invertebrate species.

There is access from Pershore Way.

References

See also
Dogsthorpe Star Pit

Local Nature Reserves in Cambridgeshire
Geography of Peterborough